Crazy Nights is a 1987 album by Kiss.
Crazy Nights Tour, a concert tour by Kiss
"Crazy Crazy Nights", a 1987 song by Kiss from the album
Crazy Nights (video), a music VHS by Kiss

Crazy Nights may also refer to:
Crazy Nights (Tygers of Pan Tang album), a 1982 album by Tygers of Pan Tang
Crazy Nights (Lonestar album), a 1997 album by Lonestar
"Crazy Night", a song by Loudness from the album Thunder in the East
"Crazy Nights", a song by 3 Inches of Blood on their album Advance and Vanquish